= Summer storage tank =

A summer storage tank is a type of structure to store water found in dry areas of India especially in Telangana and north Karnataka.

The storage tank will get water supply naturally by the flow of the river, or the tank will be pumped with water and maintained regularly. The maintenance like clean up, weeding and desilting will be carried out by either the local people, an NGO or the respective government.
